This list of compositions by Maria Szymanowska is divided into three sections: Published Works; Unpublished Works; and Uncertain Authorships, Fragments, and Arrangements. Published and Unpublished Works are further divided into works for solo keyboard, voice and piano accompaniment, and chamber works. Dates or approximate dates of published works are provided.

Published works

Works for Solo Keyboard 
 Caprice sur la Romance de Joconde (et l’on revient toujours) pour le pianoforte (1819)
 Cotillon ou Valse Figurée pour le piano [1824]
 Danse polonaise: pour le piano dédié à Monsieur Baillot (c.1825)
 Dix-huit Danses de différent genre pour le piano-forte (1819)
 Douze exercices: pour le piano (c.1825)
 Fantaisie pour le Pianoforte (c.1820)
 Grande Valse pour le pianoforte à quatre mains (c.1820)
 Le Murmure Nocturne pour le piano composé et arrangé à trios mains in A flat (c.1819)
 Nocturne in B flat 
 Polonaise pour le pianoforte sur l’air national favori du feu Prince Joseph Poniatowsky (1820)
 Polonese (1825)
 Romance de Monsieur le Prince Alexander Galitzin arrangée pour le Pianoforte (c.1820)
 Six Marches pour le pianoforte (c.1819)
 Six Menuets Pour le pianoforte (1819)
Six valses a trois mains pour le Piano Forte [1832]
 Twenty-four Mazurkas, or National Polish Dances (1826)
 Valses à trois mains pour le piano forte (c.1820)
 Vingt Exercices et Préludes pour le pianoforte (1819)

Works for Voice and Piano Accompaniment 
 Complainte d’un aveugle qui demandait l’aumône au Jardin des plantes à Paris (c.182?)
 Jadwiga, królowa polska (1816)
 Jan Albrycht (1816)
 Duma o kniaziu Michale Glińskim (1816)
 Le chant de la Vilia (1829)
 Le Départ. Romance (paroles de Cervantes, traduites par Florian) mise en Musique (1819)
 Pieśń z Wieży (1828)
 Romance à Josephine [n.d.]
Se spiegar potessi oh Dio [n.d.]
 Six Romances avec accompaniment de piano-forte (c.1820)
 Śpiewka na dwa głosy. “Ah! jakiż to piękny kwiatek” (1829)
 Śpiewka na powrót Woysk Polskich. “Nie będę łez ronić” Mazurka (1822)
 Świtezianka (c.1829)
 Trzy śpiewy z poematu Adama Mickiewicza Wallenrod (1828)
 Wilija naszych strumieni rodzica (c.1830)

Chamber Works 
 Divertissement pour le pianoforte avec accompagnement de violon (1820)
 Sérénade pour le Pianoforte avec accompagnement de Violoncelle (1820)
 Thème varié (1821)

Unpublished Works

Works for Solo Keyboard 
 Bacchelia
 Contredance Le Philis
 Marche pas redouble pour le piano-forte
 Preludium B-dur
 Romance de la Reine Hortense
 Temat Wariacji b-moll

Works for Voice and Piano Accompaniment 
 Kaźimierz Wielki
 Stefan Czarniecki

Chamber Works 
 Fanfara dwugłosowa na dwa rogi lub dwie trąbki [for two horns]

Uncertain Authorships, Fragments, Arrangements 
 Jazmena (vocal part only)
 Pieśń na głos z fortepianem (possibly by Kazimiera Wołowska)
 Three arrangements of Polish folksongs: Coś tak oczki zapłakała (Mazurek), O ia mazur rodowity (Mazurek), Błysło słonko na Zachodzie

References 

Szymanowska, Maria